The Africa Cup of Nations is an international football.

It may also refer to:

Football
 Africa Women Cup of Nations is an international women's football.
 African Nations Championship is a football tournament.

Field Hockey
 Men's Hockey Africa Cup of Nations is international women's field hockey tournament.
 Women's Hockey Africa Cup of Nations is international women's field hockey tournament.
 Men's Junior Africa Cup , formerly known as the Junior Africa Cup of Nations, is a men's international under-21 field hockey tournament.
 Women's Junior Africa Cup, formerly known as the Junior Africa Cup of Nations, is a women's international under-21 field hockey tournament.
 2017 Men's African Hockey Indoor Cup of Nations is indoor hockey is an indoor variant of outdoor field hockey.
 2017 Women's African Hockey Indoor Cup of Nations is indoor hockey is an indoor variant of outdoor field hockey.